The 2002–03 Florida Gators men's basketball team represented the University of Florida during the 2002-03 college basketball season.

References

Florida
Florida Gators men's basketball seasons
Florida